Dan B. Frankel (born April 11, 1956) is a Democratic member of the Pennsylvania House of Representatives for the 23rd District. He was first elected to the House in 1998. During the 2021-2022 legislative session, he serves as the Democratic Chair of the House Health Committee and a member of the Rules Committee.

References

External links

Pennsylvania House of Representatives – Dan Frankel official PA House website

Follow the Money – Dan Frankel
2008 2006 2004 2002 2000 1998 campaign contributions
Pennsylvania House Democratic Caucus - Rep. Dan Frankel official Party website

1956 births
Living people
Jewish American state legislators in Pennsylvania
Democratic Party members of the Pennsylvania House of Representatives
Politicians from Pittsburgh
Kenyon College alumni
21st-century American politicians
The Pennington School alumni
21st-century American Jews